The following is a list of engagements that took place in 1861 during the American Civil War.


History
The war started on April 12 when Confederate forces commanded by General P. G. T. Beauregard opened fire on the Union garrison of Fort Sumter in the harbor of Charleston, South Carolina; after a thirty-four-hour bombardment, the Union garrison surrendered. There had been no casualties during the bombardment; but the following day while the Union garrison commander, Major Robert Anderson, was firing a fifty-gun salute, there was an explosion that resulted in one man being killed and five wounded. United States president Abraham Lincoln issued a proclamation calling for the states to raise 75,000 volunteers for ninety days to suppress the South; in response to the proclamation, an additional four states (Virginia, Arkansas, Tennessee, and North Carolina) seceded and joined the Confederacy, pledging troops to the volunteer forces it was raising.
 

In the Eastern Theater, there were two major campaigns in Virginia. The first, the Western Virginia Campaign, started in May. Union forces commanded by Major General George B. McClellan invaded western Virginia and drove the Confederate forces from the area following a series of small skirmishes. Although these fights involved only a few hundred men on either side, the newspaper coverage of the campaign turned McClellan into a national hero. After McClellan was transferred to command the Army of the Potomac, Confederate General Robert E. Lee was assigned to drive the Union forces out of the state but failed to do so at Cheat Mountain and in the Kanawha Valley; Lee was subsequently transferred to other duties in November. The other major campaign ended with the First Battle of Bull Run on July 17, when Union forces commanded by Major General Irvin McDowell attacked the Confederate Army of the Potomac, commanded by Brigadier General P.G.T. Beauregard; although initially successful, Confederate reinforcements from the Shenandoah Valley routed McDowell and forced him back to Washington, D.C. McDowell was replaced by McClellan, who renamed his force the Army of the Potomac and spent the rest of the year training his men and stockpiling supplies, despite pressure from the Union government to launch an offensive as soon as possible. There were several minor skirmishes in Virginia during the remainder of the year, the most significant being the Battle of Ball's Bluff, due to the death of Colonel Edward Baker, a senator from Oregon. Outrage in Congress over his death led to the creation of the Joint Committee on the Conduct of the War, which was used by the Radical Republicans in Congress in an attempt to prosecute the war according to their views.
 
In the Western Theater, there were several skirmishes in the border state of Kentucky but no major battles. Kentucky, with divided sympathies, attempted to declare itself neutral; however, Confederate Major General Leonidas Polk sent a force to occupy Columbus, Kentucky, saying it was necessary for the defense of the Mississippi River. The Kentucky legislature then requested Union help in driving the Confederates out of the state, at which point both armies set up defensive positions all through the state. The governor and most of the legislature were Unionists, but a pro-Confederate state government, with some members of the legislature, was organized in Russellville; both armies then began recruiting efforts. Along the Atlantic seacoast and Gulf coast, Union forces captured several coastal areas for use as naval ports for the Union blockade, including Port Royal, South Carolina and the Outer Banks of North Carolina. Lincoln declared on April 19 a blockade of the Confederate coastline and ports; this required the Union navy to build hundreds of ships to enforce the blockade, growing from forty-two ships in April to a total of 264 ships at the end of the year.
 

In the Trans-Mississippi Theater, most of the fighting took place in Missouri between the pro-secessionist Missouri State Guard, commanded by Major General Sterling Price, and the Union Department of the West. Union forces under the command of Brigadier General Nathaniel Lyon drove the Missouri State Guard and the pro-secessionist portion of the state government into the southwestern part of the state, where it united with the Confederate Western Army commanded by Brigadier General Benjamin McCulloch. There, on August 10 in the Battle of Wilson's Creek, Lyon attacked the combined forces of Price and McCulloch and was defeated, with Lyon being killed during the battle. McCulloch returned to Arkansas, while Price moved north, attempting to recapture the state from Union forces. Another Confederate offensive took place in the New Mexico Territory, where a Confederate cavalry battalion moved into the southwestern part of the territory and captured Fort Filmore, forcing the surrender of the Union garrison. A secessionist convention in Mesilla declared the southern portion of the territory to be the Confederate Territory of Arizona and raised several militia companies, which fought several skirmishes with both the Union forces remaining in the territory and the Apache tribes.

Engagements

See also

 Missouri secession
 Origins of the American Civil War

Notes

Sources
 Brooksher, William Riley. Bloody Hill: The Civil War Battle of Wilson's Creek. Washington, D.C.: Brassy's, 1995. .
 Davis, William C. Battle at Bull Run: A History of the First Major Campaign of the Civil War. New York: Doubleday & Company, 1977. .
 Foote, Shelby. The Civil War: A Narrative. Volume I: Fort Sumter to Perryville. New York: Vintage Books, 1958. .
 Frazier, Donald S. Blood & Treasure: Confederate Empire in the Southwest. College Station, Texas: Texas A&M University Press, 1995. .
 Gottfried, Bradley M. The Maps of First Bull Run: An Atlas of the First Bull Run (Manassas) Campaign, including the Battle of Ball's Bluff, June–October 1861. New York: Savas Beatie, 2009. .
 Hughes, Jr., Nathaniel Cheaires. The Battle of Belmont: Grant Strikes South. Chapel Hill, North Carolina: University of North Carolina Press, 1991. .
 Hurst, Jack. Nathan Bedford Forrest: A Biography. New York: Alfred A. Knopf, 1993. .
 Josephy, Jr., Alvin M. The Civil War in the American West. New York: Alfred A. Knopf, 1992. .
 Kennedy, Frances H. The Civil War Battlefield Guide, 2nd edition. New York: Houghton Mifflin, 1998. .
 Moore, Frank. Anecdotes, Poetry, and Incidents of the War: North and South: 1860–1865. New York: The Arundel Print, 1888. 
 Neal, Diane and Thomas W. Kremm. Lion of the South: General Thomas C. Hindman. Macon, Georgia: Mercer University Press, 1993. .
 Piston, William Garnett & Richard W. Hatcher III. Wilson's Creek: The Second Battle of the Civil War and the Men Who Fought It. Chapel Hill, North Carolina: University of North Carolina Press, 2000. .
 Poland, Jr., Charles P. The Glories Of War: Small Battle And Early Heroes Of 1861]. Bloomington, IN: AuthorHouse, 2006. .
 Robertson, Jr., James I. General A. P. Hill: The Story of a Confederate Warrior. New York: Random House, 1987. .
 Wills, Mary Alice. The Confederate Blockade of Washington, D.C., 1861–1862. Shippensburg, Pennsylvania: Burd Street Press, 1998. .

1861 in the United States
American Civil War timelines
Battles of the American Civil War
Battles 1861